Events from the year 1808 in Canada.

Incumbents
Monarch: George III

Federal government
Parliament of Lower Canada: 4th (until April 27)
Parliament of Upper Canada: 4th (until March 16)

Governors
Governor of the Canadas: Robert Milnes
Governor of New Brunswick: Thomas Carleton
Governor of Nova Scotia: John Wentworth
Commodore-Governor of Newfoundland: John Holloway
Governor of Prince Edward Island: Joseph Frederick Wallet DesBarres

Events
 David Thompson explores Kootenay River.
 Simon Fraser follows Fraser River to the Pacific.
 The American Fur Company is chartered by John Jacob Astor to compete with Canadian fur trade
 The Upper Canada Militia Act 1808 states that all males between ages of sixteen and sixty are required to enroll as militiamen and are to be called out once a year for exercises
 The Legislative Assembly of Quebec criticizes the swearing-in of Ezekiel Hart because he is of Jewish faith, and votes his expulsion.

Births
April – Charles Wilson, politician (d.1877)
April 7 – John Langton, businessman, political figure and civil servant (d.1894)
April 10 – William Annand, 2nd Premier of Nova Scotia (d.1887)
April 25 – Malcolm Cameron, businessman and politician (d.1876) 
August 15 or September 16 – Charles Fisher, politician and 1st Premier of the Colony of New Brunswick (d.1880)
September 14 – Edwin Atwater, businessperson and municipal politician (d.1874)
October 20 – Narcisse-Fortunat Belleau, lawyer, businessman and politician (d.1894)

Deaths
November 10 : Guy Carleton, 1st Baron Dorchester, military and governor
 Peter Russell (politician), judge

References 

 
Canada
08
1808 in North America